Kammerlander is an Austrian surname that may refer to
Gerald Kammerlander (born 1981), Austrian luger
Hans Kammerlander (born 1956), Italian mountaineer
185321 Kammerlander, a minor planet named after Hans
Simon Breitfuss Kammerlander (born 1992), Bolivian-Austrian alpine skier
Thomas Kammerlander (born 1990), Austrian luger, brother of Gerald
Tobias Kammerlander (born 1986), Austrian Nordic combined skier 

German-language surnames